Lidija Rupnik (20 February 1915 – 2003) was a Slovenian gymnast. She competed in the women's artistic team all-around event at the 1936 Summer Olympics.  Additionally, she competed at the 1938 World Championships where she placed 7th in the individual all-around competition and led her team in scoring to win the team silver medal.

References

External links
 

1915 births
2003 deaths
Slovenian female artistic gymnasts
Olympic gymnasts of Yugoslavia
Gymnasts at the 1936 Summer Olympics
Sportspeople from Trieste